Chris Clarke (born 1971 in Lancashire) is an English croquet player who has been ranked among the world's top players since the late 1980s. He now represents New Zealand. Chris has won two World Championships in Association Croquet, in 1995 and again in 2008, six AC World Team Champs and one GC World Team Champs. 2008 was perhaps Chris's finest year, overtaking previous world champions Robert Fulford and Reg Bamford to regain the position of world number one player, which he held for in excess of 16 months. He also reached the semi-finals of the  WCF Golf Croquet World Championships in March 2008 in Cape Town, South Africa and led the English team to the finals of the  2009 European team championships.

Clarke now lives in Christchurch, New Zealand. On 30 January 2008 he was married to Jenny Clarke (née Williams), who plays for New Zealand. The pair were therefore due to be on opposing sides when Great Britain played New Zealand in the 2010 MacRobertson Shield, before Clarke withdrew with a back injury.

In October 2012, Clarke returned to competitive association croquet singles, having won multiple Open doubles titles in the meantime as well as GC singles events where he rose to world number 2. In November 2012, he completed the requisite ten matches needed to return to the world rankings, which he did in first place. Clarke switched to represent New Zealand following his controversial non-selection for England's golf croquet squad, and was a member of their victorious 2014 MacRobertson Shield team, playing at number 1 where he was the winningmost player in the event.

In 2016, Clarke played his last International event involving singles when he captained NZ to win the GC World Championship, once again being the winningmost player in the event. This victory made Clarke the first player to win three of the four WCF Open World Titles. He finished his career having won 9 World titles and never having lost a major International Test Match.

Start of career
Clarke started playing croquet while a 13-year-old student at Queen Elizabeth's Grammar School, Blackburn under the coaching of French teacher Andrew Bennet.

Achievements
World Ranking at 1 August 2005: 2

World Ranking at 18 November 2007: 3

World Ranking at 29 July 2008: 1

World Ranking at 29 June 2009: 1

World Ranking at 20 November 2012: 1

World Ranking at 20 August 2014: 1

World Croquet Federation World Championships:

2008 - Winner
2005 - 1st Round
2002 - Quarter final
2001 - 2nd Round
1995 - Winner
1994 - Finalist
1992 - 1st Round
1991 - Semi Final
1990 - 1st Round
1989 - 4th Round

5-times President's Cup winner.

Represented Great Britain in five MacRobertson Shield competitions (captain in 1996), and New Zealand once.

Chris has won 10 British Open Doubles titles (9 with Robert Fulford).

He has won the British Opens Singles title in 1997, British Men's Championships in 2005, Sonoma-Cutrer World Croquet Championship in 1997.

2006
Winner South Island Doubles (with Jenny Williams)
Runner-up South Island Singles
Winner New Zealand Open Doubles (with Robert Fulford)
Winner Australian Open Doubles (with Robert Fulford)
Winner British Men's Championships
Winner Australian Open Singles
Winner New Zealand Golf Croquet Open

2007
Winner New Zealand Open Singles
Winner New Zealand Open Doubles (with Jenny Williams)
Winner South Island Doubles (with JW)
Winner South Island Singles
Winner Championship of Surrey
Winner British Mixed Doubles Championships (with JW)

External links
Current World Rankings

English croquet players
Living people
1971 births